Ronald Attard (born March 20, 1999) is an American professional ice hockey defenceman for the Lehigh Valley Phantoms in the American Hockey League (AHL) as a prospect under contract to the Philadelphia Flyers in the National Hockey League (NHL). He was drafted 72nd overall by the Flyers in the 2019 NHL Entry Draft.

Early life
Attard was born on March 20, 1999, in White Lake Township, Michigan, USA to parents Toms and Sue. He grew up alongside two older sisters; Jessica and Julia.

Playing career

Amateur
Growing up in Michigan, Attard played minor ice hockey for the Honeybaked and Victory Honda before being drafted by the Tri-City Storm of the United States Hockey League (USHL). During his rookie season with the Storm, Attard announced his commitment to play NCAA Division I ice hockey with the Western Michigan Broncos men's ice hockey team.

Through the offseason prior to the 2018–19 season, Attard split his training between working out at Western Michigan with former NHL head coach Andy Murray and the Broncos. His offseason coaching caused Attard to endure a breakout season and win both the USHL Player and Defenseman of the Year. During the 2018–19 season, he set a league single-season record for most goals and points by a defenseman with 30 goals and 65 points. On the way to 30 goals, he also recorded a four-goal game, becoming the first USHL defenseman in more than three years to achieve this feat. As a result of his play as team captain, he won both the 2019 Dave Tyler Junior Player of the Year Award and USHL Defenseman of the Year award.

Leading up to the 2019 NHL Entry Draft, Attard was ranked 76th amongst all North American skaters by the NHL Central Scouting Bureau. He was eventually drafted in the third round, 72nd overall, by the Philadelphia Flyers.

Following the NHL Entry Draft, Attard began his freshman season at the Western Michigan University which was eventually cut short due to the COVID-19 pandemic. During the shortened season, he appeared in 30 games, finishing with 14 points, and was the top scoring defenseman on the team. The following year, Attard continued his offensive output and was selected for the AHCA First-Team All-American team and nominated for the Hobey Baker Award.

Professional
Following the completion of his junior season with Western Michigan, Attard concluded his collegiate career in agreeing to immediately join the Philadelphia Flyers for the remainder of the  season on a two-year, entry-level contract on March 29, 2022. Four days later, Attard made his NHL debut in the Flyers' 6–3 loss to the Toronto Maple Leafs. He was subbed in for Keith Yandle, whose iron man streak ended after a record 989 games. On April 5, Attard recorded his first NHL point, assisting on a goal by James van Riemsdyk in the Flyers' 4–2 loss to the Columbus Blue Jackets.

International play
Attard was named captain of Team USA at the 2018 World Junior A Challenge, where he helped lead the team to a gold medal win over Russia.

Career statistics

Awards and honors

References

External links
 

1999 births
Living people
AHCA Division I men's ice hockey All-Americans
American ice hockey defensemen
Ice hockey players from Michigan
Lehigh Valley Phantoms players
Philadelphia Flyers draft picks
Philadelphia Flyers players
Tri-City Storm players
Western Michigan Broncos men's ice hockey players